The Glyndon Hotel is a historic hotel in Richmond, Kentucky, United States.

History 
The original Glyndon Hotel was built in 1889 to replace Green's opera house. At that time horse-drawn streetcars carried guests from the L&N Railroad depot located further east on Main Street to the hotel. After a fire destroyed the original hotel in 1891, the current four-story brick structure was erected on the foundation of the earlier one. The new hotel opened in the fall of 1892 under the management of George G. Corzelius (1864–1948).

Des Jardins and Hayward, a noted Cincinnati architectural firm, designed the existing edifice. The principal partner, Samuel E. Des Jardins, also designed four of Richmond's largest residences a few years earlier: the Pattie Field Clay House in 1883, Amberley in 1885, the Bennett House in 1885-90 and Elmwood in 1887.

The front four-story facade has four bays. Round arches cap the grouped windows on the fourth story. Below, a three-story projection with balconies on each level emphasizes the asymmetrically placed main entrances. In the early days of the Glyndon, ladies did not use this entrance; they entered by way of a separate side entrance. White trim consists of latticed balcony railing, Tuscan columns, and window details. Large arches continue the rounded detailing of the exterior into the interior and connect the entrance to the lobby.

Initially, three large cisterns at the rear supplied the hotel with water. A lengthy side porch provided for the popular pastime of promenading, and a mezzanine afforded relaxing pleasure to many guests. The dining room operated from the hotel's opening until 1965. A painting of Daniel Boone by Bert Mullins was executed especially for the Glyndon and has hung in the lobby since 1932.

The name Glyndon is Danish for "haven of rest". The Glyndon has served a noteworthy group of people, including U.S. Vice President Alben Barkley, Clark Gable and Carole Lombard, and several governors, as well as businessmen and educators from all parts of the world.

In the year 1987 the inaugural "Yoo-hoo Bath" took place in the hallway of the Glyndon. The Yoo-hoo bath is given to the winner of the historic Noble Wendy Roman Baseball League. Teddy Marshall was the recipient of the bath. The bath was performed by other league members, Robert Bryant, J. Michael Levan, and James Barrett 'Little Pony' Cowan.

References

Hotels in Kentucky
Richmond, Kentucky
Railway hotels in the United States
Louisville and Nashville Railroad
1892 establishments in Kentucky
Historic district contributing properties in Kentucky
Hotel buildings completed in 1892